Ryssonotus nebulosus is a beetle of the family Lucanidae, and the sole member of the genus Ryssonotus (often misspelled as "Rhyssonotus"). It is found in Queensland and New South Wales, Australia.

Gallery

References 

 G. Cassis, W.W.K. Houston, T.A. Weir & B.P. Moore (1992). Updated by A.A. Calder (2002). Coleoptera: Scarabaeoida.Australian Faunal Directory. Australian Biological Resources Study, Canberra. Viewed 22 November 2007.

External links
Images Beetlespace

Lucaninae
Beetles of Australia
Beetles described in 1818
Lucanidae genera
Monotypic Scarabaeiformia genera